The Billy Goat Reefs, part of the Great Dog Group within the Furneaux Group, are a close group of four small islands, joined at low tide, with a combined area of , located in the Bass Strait between the Flinders and Cape Barren islands, in Tasmania, in south-eastern Australia.

Fauna
Recorded breeding seabird and wader species are little penguin, white-faced storm-petrel, sooty oystercatcher and Caspian tern.  Reptiles present include the metallic skink, White's skink and white-lipped snake.

See also

 List of islands of Tasmania

References

Furneaux Group
Islands of Bass Strait
Islands of North East Tasmania